Blue-Eyed Mary is a lost 1918 silent film drama directed by Harry Millarde and starring June Caprice. It was produced and released by Fox Film Corporation.

Cast
June Caprice - Mary Du Bois
Helen Tracy - Mrs. Van Twiller Du Bois
Blanche Hines - Jeanette
Bernard Randall - Cecil Harrington
Thomas F. Fallon - Jones, the Butler(*as Thomas Fallon)
Jack McLean - Tom Vane
Florence Ashbrooke - Bridget
Henry Hallam - Henry Leffingwell

See also
1937 Fox vault fire

References

External links

1918 films
American silent feature films
Lost American films
Fox Film films
Films directed by Harry F. Millarde
American black-and-white films
Silent American drama films
1918 drama films
1918 lost films
Lost drama films
1910s American films